The Naismith Prep Player of the Year award, named for Canadian basketball inventor James Naismith, is given annually by the Atlanta Tipoff Club to high school basketball's top male and female player. The inaugural awards were given to Dennis Scott and Lynne Lorenzen in 1987.

Key

†To be considered for induction by a screening committee, a player must be fully retired from play for at least three years.

Winners

Boys

Girls

See also
List of U.S. high school basketball national player of the year awards
Gatorade Player of the Year awards
Mr. Basketball USA

External links

American basketball trophies and awards
High school basketball in the United States
Awards established in 1987